The 2022 KIOTI Tractor Champions Cup was held May 3–8 at the Olds Sportsplex in Olds, Alberta. It is the fifth and final Grand Slam event of the 2021–22 curling season.

Qualification
Twelve teams qualified for the Champions Cup through winning different events over the course of the 2021–22 season. Team Brad Jacobs qualified as the Sponsor's Exemption.

Men

Women

Men

Teams

The teams are listed as follows:

Round-robin standings
Final round-robin standings

Round-robin results
All draw times are listed in Mountain Daylight Time (UTC−06:00).

Draw 1
Tuesday, May 3, 1:00 pm

Draw 2
Tuesday, May 3, 4:30 pm

Draw 3
Tuesday, May 3, 8:00 pm

Draw 4
Wednesday, May 4, 8:30 am

Draw 5
Wednesday, May 4, 12:00 pm

Draw 6
Wednesday, May 4, 4:00 pm

Draw 7
Wednesday, May 4, 8:00 pm

Draw 8
Thursday, May 5, 8:30 am

Draw 9
Thursday, May 5, 12:00 pm

Draw 10
Thursday, May 5, 4:00 pm

Draw 11
Thursday, May 5, 8:00 pm

Draw 12
Friday, May 6, 8:30 am

Draw 13
Friday, May 6, 12:00 pm

Draw 14
Friday, May 6, 4:00 pm

Draw 15
Friday, May 6, 8:00 pm

Playoffs
{{6TeamBracket|RD1-RD2-path=0
| RD1 = Quarterfinals
| RD2 = Semifinals
| RD3 = Final
| team-width = 150px

| RD1-seed1 = 4
| RD1-team1 =  Brendan Bottcher
| RD1-score1 = 3
| RD1-seed2 = 5
| RD1-team2 =  Brad Gushue
| RD1-score2 = 6

| RD1-seed3 = 3
| RD1-team3 =  Brad Jacobs
| RD1-score3 = 6
| RD1-seed4 = 6
| RD1-team4 =  Jason Gunnlaugson
| RD1-score4 = 2

| RD2-seed1 = 1
| RD2-team1 =  Niklas Edin
| RD2-score1 = 5
| RD2-seed2 = 5
| RD2-team2 =  Brad Gushue| RD2-score2 = 6| RD2-seed3 = 2
| RD2-team3 =  Kevin Koe| RD2-score3 = 4| RD2-seed4 = 3
| RD2-team4 =  Brad Jacobs
| RD2-score4 = 3

| RD3-seed1 = 5
| RD3-team1 =  Brad Gushue| RD3-score1 = 8'| RD3-seed2 = 2
| RD3-team2 =  Kevin Koe
| RD3-score2 = 5
}}

QuarterfinalsSaturday, May 7, 4:00 pmSemifinalsSaturday, May 7, 8:00 pmFinalSunday, May 8, 10:00 amWomen

Teams

The teams are listed as follows:

Round-robin standingsFinal round-robin standingsRound-robin results
All draw times are listed in Mountain Daylight Time (UTC−06:00).

Draw 1Tuesday, May 3, 1:00 pmDraw 2Tuesday, May 3, 4:30 pmDraw 3Tuesday, May 3, 8:00 pmDraw 4Wednesday, May 4, 8:30 amDraw 5Wednesday, May 4, 12:00 pmDraw 6Wednesday, May 4, 4:00 pmDraw 7Wednesday, May 4, 8:00 pmDraw 8Thursday, May 5, 8:30 amDraw 9Thursday, May 5, 12:00 pmDraw 10Thursday, May 5, 4:00 pmDraw 11Thursday, May 5, 8:00 pmDraw 12Friday, May 6, 8:30 amDraw 13Friday, May 6, 12:00 pmDraw 14Friday, May 6, 4:00 pmDraw 15Friday, May 6, 8:00 pmTiebreakerSaturday, May 7, 12:00 pmPlayoffs

QuarterfinalsSaturday, May 7, 4:00 pmSemifinalsSaturday, May 7, 8:00 pmFinalSunday, May 8, 2:00 pm''

Notes

References

External links

Champions Cup
2022 in Canadian curling
Curling competitions in Alberta
2022 in Alberta
Champions Cup (curling)